South Okanagan-Similkameen Transit provides local public, regional, and interregional transportation services in the City of Penticton in the Okanagan Valley of British Columbia, Canada, and outlying communities, with a fleet of fully accessible low floor transit buses. The system consists of six scheduled routes serving the city (including night service), and routes to outlying communities including Summerland, Naramata, Princeton, and Osoyoos.

Routes

Scheduled services

Former routes

In September 2019, Route 60 Kelowna was cancelled in favour of a twice daily (four times on Monday) commuter service (Route 70) in both directions on weekdays. The route was expanded to four trips each weekday in January 2022. The former route operated only on Mondays.

References

External links
BC Transit: South Okanagan-Similkameen Transit System
Transit History of British Columbia Communities - Penticton
BC Transit-Penticton
Whistler Shuttles

Transit agencies in British Columbia
Transport in Penticton